Hotel Paradise is a 1995 29min short film by director Nicolas Roeg and writer Michael Allin starring Theresa Russell, Vincent D'Onofrio, and Jimmy Batten. It was presented at the Montreal World Film Festival as part of trilogy with Sweeties by Cinzia Th. Torrini in Italian and Devilish Education by Janusz Maiewski in Polish.

References

1995 films